Histone cluster 2 H3 family member d is a protein that in humans is encoded by the HIST2H3D gene.

Function

Histones are basic nuclear proteins that are responsible for the nucleosome structure of the chromosomal fiber in eukaryotes. Two molecules of each of the four core histones (H2A, H2B, H3, and H4) form an octamer, around which approximately 146 bp of DNA is wrapped in repeating units, called nucleosomes. The linker histone, H1, interacts with linker DNA between nucleosomes and functions in the compaction of chromatin into higher order structures. This gene is intronless and encodes a replication-dependent histone that is a member of the histone H3 family. [provided by RefSeq, Aug 2015].

References

Further reading